is a passenger railway station located in the town of Minano, Saitama, Japan, operated by the private railway operator Chichibu Railway.

Lines

Station layout
The station is staffed and consists of one side platform and one island platform serving three tracks in total. Track 3 is a bidirectional line normally used by freight services only.

Platforms

Adjacent stations

History
Oyahana Station opened on 27 October 1914.

Passenger statistics
In fiscal 2018, the station was used by an average of 395 passengers daily.

Surrounding area
 Arakawa River

See also
 List of railway stations in Japan

References

External links

 Oyahana Station information (Saitama Prefectural Government) 
 Oyahana Station timetable 

Railway stations in Japan opened in 1914
Railway stations in Saitama Prefecture
Minano, Saitama